Hi Infidelity is the ninth studio album by American rock band REO Speedwagon, released on November 21, 1980 by Epic Records. The album became a big hit in the United States, peaking at number one on the Billboard 200. It went on to become the biggest-selling album of 1981, eventually being certified 10 times platinum by the Recording Industry Association of America. Of the four singles released, "Take It on the Run" went to number 5 on the Billboard Hot 100, and the band got their first of two number one hits with  "Keep On Loving You".

Background
The album title is a play on the term "in high fidelity," which used to appear on album covers. The album art is an illustration of this pun where an act of sexual infidelity is apparently occurring while the man is putting a record LP to play on the hi-fi stereo.

Songs
Six songs from the album charted on the Billboard charts, including "Keep On Loving You" which was the band's first Number 1 hit, and "Take It on the Run", which reached No. 5 on the charts. The song "Tough Guys" uses an audio clip from the 1937 Our Gang episode "Hearts Are Thumps".

"Tough Guys" was one of two songs from the album that charted on the Billboard Mainstream Rock chart despite not being released as singles.  Music critic Robert Christgau called "Tough Guys" his favorite song from the album but suggested that the line "They think they're full of fire/She thinks they're full of shit" would prevent the song from reaching the pop Top 40.

Record World described "I Wish You Were There" as having a "novel gospel touch."

Reissues
On October 25, 2004, the band recorded the songs of this album live from beginning to end for an XM Radio "Then Again Live" special.

On July 19, 2011, Sony Music re-released Hi Infidelity with bonus demo tracks for the album's 30th anniversary. Demo tracks were recorded Live at Crystal Studios, Hollywood, June through August 1980.

Track listing

Original release

30th Anniversary edition (2011)

Personnel 

REO Speedwagon
 Kevin Cronin – lead and backing vocals (except on "Someone Tonight"), acoustic and rhythm guitars, acoustic piano on "Keep on Loving You" and "I Wish You Were There"
 Gary Richrath – electric guitar
 Neal Doughty – keyboards
 Bruce Hall – bass, lead vocal on "Someone Tonight"
 Alan Gratzer – drums, tambourine on "I Wish You Were There"

Additional personnel
 Steve Forman – percussion on "Keep on Loving You"
 Tom Kelly – backing vocals
 Richard Page – backing vocals
 N Yolletta - backing vocals on "In Your Letter"

Production 
 Kevin Beamish – producer, engineer 
 Kevin Cronin – producer, arrangements
 Gary Richrath – producer
 Alan Gratzer – co-producer 
 Tom Cummings – assistant engineer 
 Jeff Eccles – assistant engineer 
 Kent Duncan – mastering at Kendun Recorders (Burbank, California).
 Aaron Rapoport – photography 
 John Kosh – art direction, design 
 Bobby Gordon – lighting design 
 John Baruck – management
 Al Quaglieri – reissue producer
 Joseph M. Palmaccio – remastering
 Laura Grover – remastering supervisor

Charts

Weekly charts

Year-end charts

Singles

Certifications

Release history

Notes

References

REO Speedwagon albums
1980 albums
Epic Records albums
Albums produced by Kevin Beamish
Albums produced by Gary Richrath
Albums produced by Kevin Cronin